German submarine U-534 is a Type IXC/40 U-boat of Nazi Germany's Kriegsmarine built for service during World War II. She was built in 1942 in Hamburg-Finkenwerder by Deutsche Werft AG as yard number 352. She was launched on 23 September 1942 and commissioned on 23 December with Oberleutnant zur See Herbert Nollau in command.
 
U-534 is one of only four German World War II submarines in preserved condition remaining in the world, the others being the IXC boat  in Chicago's Museum of Science and Industry, the VIIC/41 boat  at the Laboe Naval Memorial near Kiel and the XXI boat  in Bremerhaven. U-534 was used mainly for training duties; during her service she sank no other ships. A Royal Air Force bomber sank her on 5 May 1945 in the Kattegat 20 kilometres northeast of the Danish island of Anholt. U-534 was salvaged on 23 August 1993 and was moved to Woodside Ferry, Birkenhead to form the 'U-Boat Story' museum. This attraction opened on 10 February 2009 and closed in 2020.

In October 2021, ownership of U-534 transferred to Big Heritage, operators of nearby Western Approaches Museum.

Design
German Type IXC/40 submarines were slightly larger than the original Type IXCs. U-534 had a displacement of  when on the surface and  while submerged. She had two shafts and two  propellers.

U-534 was fitted with six  torpedo tubes - (four fitted in the bow and two at the stern), 22 torpedoes, one  SK C/32 naval gun, with 180 rounds and a  SK C/30 as well as a  C/30 anti-aircraft gun. The boat had a complement of forty-eight.

Service history
After commissioning, U-534 was assigned to the 4th U-boat Flotilla, based in Stettin, for training purposes and weapons testing, including the new acoustic torpedo Zaunkoenig T-5, until February 1943. She was then reconfigured (main gun removed, flak gun added) and in June 1943 transferred to the 2nd flotilla "Saltzwedel".

May 1944
U-534 headed for Bergen and arrived on 6 May 1944.

Her first war patrol was plagued by an oil leak and bad weather in the North Atlantic.

August 1944
On 11 August she was attacked by an aircraft but escaped undamaged. The aircraft, E of No. 58 Squadron RAF and K of No. 502 Squadron RAF suffered heavy flak damage. U-534 arrived safely in Bordeaux, where she was fitted with a Schnorchel.

On the second patrol, from 25 August 1944 to 24 October, the boat had to escape the Allied blockade of Lorient in France and get back to a friendly port. On 25 August U-534 left Bordeaux and the new Schnorchel was used for the first time. Exhaust gases leaked into the boat and several crew members collapsed. Surfacing for air, she was spotted and attacked by a Wellington bomber, B of No. 172 Squadron RAF, which her gunners shot down on 27 August. On 28 October, she arrived in Kiel where she was transferred to the 33rd U-boat Flotilla and underwent an extensive refit in Stettin, which put her out of action until 1 May 1945.

May 1945
In the early hours of 5 May 1945, a partial surrender ordered by Admiral Dönitz of German forces in Denmark, Germany and other areas came into effect. U-534 was informed by the harbour master at Oresund Elsinore that the ceasefire was in effect south of the 56th parallel.

Incidents leading to sinking

The crew managed to shoot one bomber down, and nine depth charges from the bombing runs missed, but then the boat received a direct hit by a depth charge from G/86. U-534 began to take on water as a result of the damage to her aft section by the engine rooms, and sank north-east of Anholt.

U-534 had aboard a crew of 52 men; all escaped the sub, 49 survived to be rescued. Five were trapped in the torpedo room as she began to sink, but they managed to escape through the torpedo loading hatch once the boat had settled on the sea bed. One of them, 17-year-old radio operator, Josef Neudorfer, failed to exhale as he was surfacing and died from damage to his lungs. Two others (including the submarine's radio operator of Argentine origin) died of exposure while in the water.

Armament

FLAK weaponry

U-534 carried the rare Twin 3.7 cm Flakzwilling M43U on the DLM42 mount. This was one of the best AA weapons of Nazi Germany's Kriegsmarine. The DLM42 mount was used mainly on the Type IX as it was too heavy for the Type VII U-boats. The 3.7 cm Flak M42U was the marine version of the 3.7 cm Flak used by the Kriegsmarine on Type VII and Type IX U-boats.

Anti-sonar counter-measures
Just above the propeller shaft on the starboard side was the exit chute of a Pillenwerfer. It could deploy an anti-sonar decoy called Bold, named after Kobold, a goblin in German folklore. This made a false target for the enemy's sonar by creating a screen of bubbles from the chemical reaction of calcium hydride with sea water.

Salvage
U-534 lay on the sea bed for nearly 41 years, until she was discovered at a depth of 67 meters in 1986 by a Danish wreck hunter, Aage Jensen. Shortly afterwards, the wreck hunters' group contacted Danish media millionaire Karsten Ree, who sponsored raising the submarine, as rumours of Nazi gold caused intense media coverage. However, the boat turned out to contain nothing unusual.

U-534 was raised to the surface on 23 August 1993 by the Dutch salvage company Smit Tak.

Museum ship
Transported to Birkenhead, England, in 1996, the vessel formed part of the Warship Preservation Trust's collection at Birkenhead Docks until the museum closed on 5 February 2006. On 27 June 2007, the Merseytravel transit authority announced that it had acquired the submarine to display at the Woodside Ferry Terminal.

For technical reasons and to facilitate economical transportation to its new site, the vessel was cut into five sections, two of which were subsequently re-joined. It is now displayed in sectioned form to allow visitors better visibility without entering the U-boat. Merseytravel said that preserving the hull intact would have created prohibitive transport costs. Engineers began a month-long operation to divide U-534, using a diamond wire cutter, on 6 February 2008. On 10 March 2008, the sections, each weighing as much as 240 tonnes, were transported over several days by floating crane.

The U-boat Story exhibition opened on 10 February 2009.

On 24 October 2021 it was announced that the custodianship of U-534 was to be given to heritage charity Big Heritage, operators of the Western Approaches Museum in Liverpool.

Gallery

See also

Surviving U-boats
 SM U-1
 
 
  (originally U-2540)

Other

References

Bibliography

External links

 Mersey Ferries: U-Boat Story
 Future of the U-534 article

 U-534 Website Moved 2010-Est 1996 Much information and photos
 Raising U-534
 Pictures from the raising of U-534
 Items found inside U-534
 The U-534 Enigma messages
 U-Boat 534 raised, short video of the recovery of U-534

German Type IX submarines
U-boats commissioned in 1942
U-boats sunk in 1945
World War II submarines of Germany
Museum ships in the United Kingdom
1942 ships
Museums in Merseyside
World War II museums in the United Kingdom
Birkenhead
Ships built in Hamburg
U-boats sunk by British aircraft
Maritime incidents in May 1945